Conques is a locality located in the municipality of Isona i Conca Dellà, in Province of Lleida province, Catalonia, Spain. As of 2020, it has a population of 113.

Geography 

References

Populated places in the Province of Lleida